The western limbless skink (Melanoseps occidentalis) is an extant species of skink, a lizard in the family Scincidae. The species is found in  Cameroon, Equatorial Guinea, Gabon, Democratic Republic of the Congo, Angola, and Central African Republic.

References

Melanoseps
Reptiles described in 1877
Taxa named by Wilhelm Peters